Atreipus is an ichnogenus or trace fossil attributed to early Ornithischian dinosaurs. Its significance for Triassic biostratigraphy has earned it some fame.
Reptile footprint faunules from the early Mesozoic Newark Supergroup of eastern North America.

See also

 Ichnology

References

Dinosaur trace fossils